A recumbent bicycle is a bicycle that places the rider in a laid-back reclining position. Most recumbent riders choose this type of design for ergonomic reasons: the rider's weight is distributed comfortably over a larger area, supported by back and buttocks. On a traditional upright bicycle, the body weight rests entirely on a small portion of the sitting bones, the feet, and the hands.

Most recumbent models also have an aerodynamic advantage; the reclined, legs-forward position of the rider's body presents a smaller frontal profile. A recumbent holds the world speed record for a bicycle, and they were banned from racing under the Union Cycliste Internationale (UCI) in 1934, and now race under the banner of the World Human Powered Vehicle Association (WHPVA) and International Human Powered Vehicle Association (IHPVA).

Recumbents are available in a wide range of configurations, including: long to short wheelbase; large, small, or a mix of wheel sizes; overseat, underseat, or no-hands steering; and rear wheel or front wheel drive. A variant with three wheels is a recumbent tricycle.

Description
 

Recumbents can be categorized by their wheelbase, wheel sizes, steering system, faired or unfaired, and front-wheel or rear-wheel drive.

Wheelbase

Long-wheelbase (LWB) models have the pedals located between the front and rear wheels; short-wheelbase (SWB) models have the pedals in front of the front wheel; compact long-wheelbase (CLWB) models have the pedals either very close to the front wheel or above it. Within these categories are variations, intermediate types, and even convertible designs (LWB to CLWB) – there is no "standard" recumbent.

Wheel sizes
The front wheel is commonly smaller than the rear, although a number of recumbents feature dual 26-inch (ISO 559), 650c (ISO 571), 700c (ISO 622), or even 29 x 4" oversize all-terrain tires. Given the higher rolling resistance of the smaller front wheel, loss of steering and control are somewhat more likely attempting sharp or quick changes of direction while crossing over patches of loose dirt, sand or pebbles. Larger diameter wheels generally have lower rolling resistance but a higher profile leading to higher air resistance. High-racer aficionados also claim that they are more stable, and although it is easier to balance a bicycle with a higher center of mass, the wide variety of recumbent designs makes such generalizations unreliable. Another advantage of both wheels being the same size is that the bike requires only one size of inner tube.

One common arrangement is an ISO 559 (26-inch) rear wheel and an ISO 406 or ISO 451 (20-inch) front wheel. The small front wheel and large rear wheel combination is used to keep the pedals and front wheel clear of each other, avoiding the problem on a short wheelbase recumbent called "heel strike" (where the rider's heels catch the wheel in tight turns). A pivoting-boom front-wheel drive (PBFWD aka moving bottom bracket recumbent) configuration also overcomes heel strike since the pedals and front wheel turn together. PBFWD bikes may have dual  wheels or larger.

Steering

Steering for recumbent bikes can be generally categorized as
 over-seat (OSS) or above seat steering (ASS);
 under-seat (USS); or
 center steering or pivot steering.
OSS/ASS is generally direct—the steerer acts on the front fork like a standard bicycle handlebar—but the bars themselves may extend well behind the front wheel (more like a tiller); alternatively the bars might have long rearward extensions (sometimes known as Superman or Kingcycle bars). Chopper-style bars are sometimes seen on LWB bikes.

USS is usually indirect—the bars link to the headset through a system of rods or cables and possibly a bell crank. Most tadpole trikes are USS.

Center steered or pivot steered recumbents, such as Flevobikes and Pythons, may have no handlebars at all.

In addition, some trikes such as the Sidewinder have used rear-wheel steer, instead of the more common front-wheel steer.  They can provide good maneuverability at low speeds, but have been reported to be potentially unstable at speeds above .

Drive
Most recumbents have the cranks attached to a boom fixed to the frame, with a long drive chain for rear wheel drive. However, due to the proximity of the crank to the front wheel, front wheel drive (FWD) can be an option, and it allows for a much shorter chain. One style requires the chain to twist slightly to allow for steering.

Another style, pivoting-boom FWD (PBFWD), has the crankset connected to and moving with the front fork. In addition to the much shorter chain, the advantages to PBFWD are use of a larger front wheel for lower rolling resistance without heel strike (you can pedal while turning) and use of the upper body when sprinting or climbing. The main disadvantage to all FWD designs is "wheelspin" when climbing steep hills covered with loose gravel, wet grass, etc. This mainly affects off-road riders, and can be ameliorated by shifting the weight forward, applying steady pressure to the pedals, and using tires with more aggressive tread. Another disadvantage of PBFWD for some riders is a slightly longer "learning curve" due to adaptation to the pedal-steer effect (forces applied to the pedal can actually steer the bike). Beginner riders tend to swerve along a serpentine path until they adapt a balanced pedal motion. After adaptation, a PBFWD recumbent can be ridden in as straight a line as any other bike, and can even be steered accurately with the feet only. Cruzbike is the only PBFWD recumbent currently in production, and features a traditional steering axis similar to most standard and recumbent bikes. Flevobike formerly produced a center-steered FWD bike similar to the Python Lowracer.

Yet another drive-train variation is on rowing cycles where the rider rows using arms and legs.

Fully suspended bikes
Modern recumbent bikes are increasingly being fitted with front and rear suspension systems for increased comfort and traction on rough surfaces. Coil, elastomer, and air-sprung suspension systems have all been used on recumbent bikes, with oil or air-damping in the forks and rear shock absorbers. The maturation of fully suspended conventional mountain bikes has aided the development of these designs, which often use many of the same parts, suitably modified for recumbent use.

Fairings

Some riders fit their bikes with aerodynamic devices called fairings. These can reduce aerodynamic drag and help keep the rider warmer and drier in cold and wet weather. Fairings are also available for upright bikes, but are much less common. Fully enclosed bikes and trikes are considered velomobiles.

Seats
The seats themselves are either of mesh stretched tightly over a frame or foam cushions over hard shells like the Stinger pictured, which might be moulded or assembled from sheet materials. Hard-shell seats predominate in Europe, mesh seats in the USA.

Variations

Mountain bike recumbents
With the right equipment and design, recumbent bikes can be used for riding unpaved roads and offroad, just as with conventional mountain bikes. Because of their longer wheelbase and the manner in which the rider is confined to the seat, recumbents are not as easy to use on tight, curving unpaved singletrack. Large-diameter wheels, mountain gearing and off-road specific design have been used since 1999. Crank-forward designs that facilitate climbing out of the saddle, such as the RANS Dynamik, also can be used off-road.

Lowracers
Lowracers are a type of recumbent more common in Europe among racing enthusiasts. These typically have two 20" wheels or a 26" wheel at the rear and 20" wheel at the front. The seat is positioned between the wheels rather than above them. The extreme reclined position, and the fact that the rider is sitting in line with the wheels rather than atop them, makes this type the most aerodynamic of unfaired recumbents.

Highracers
Highracers are distinguished by using two large wheels (usually ISO 559, 650c or 700c). This necessitates a higher bottom bracket than on a lowracer so that the rider's legs are above the front wheel, and this in turn requires a higher seat. The seating position may be otherwise identical to that on a lowracer allowing similar aerodynamics. "Racer" in the name implies that this will often be the case, since these bikes strive for speed.

Highracers are generally more maneuverable than lowracers since their higher center of mass make them easier to balance at lower speeds. Given the same seating position they may be faster than lowracers, since it is widely believed that rolling resistance is inversely proportional to wheel diameter. However, lowracer proponents reply that their design is faster due to aerodynamics. The reasoning is that the riders body is in line with the wheels, reducing drag.

Hip and elbow injuries are more common on highracers than on lowracers due to the greater height from which the rider can fall. However, the injuries are very rare and seldom serious.

Semi-recumbent and crank forward bicycles
Bicycles that use positions intermediate between a conventional upright and a recumbent are called semi-recumbent or crank forward designs. These generally are intended for casual use and have comfort and ease of use as primary objectives, with aerodynamics sacrificed for this purpose.

Tandem recumbents

Just as with upright bicycles, recumbents are built and marketed with more than one seat, thus combining the advantages of recumbents with those of tandem bicycles. In order to keep the wheelbase from being any longer than absolutely necessary, tandem recumbents often place the stoker's crankset under the captain's seat. A common configuration for two riders in the recumbent position is the sociable tandem, wherein the two riders ride side by side. There are also hybrid recumbent designs such as the Hase Pino Allround that utilize a recumbent stoker in the front, and an upright pilot in the rear.

Recumbent tricycles 

Recumbent tricycles (trikes) are closely related to recumbent bicycles, but have three wheels instead of two. The three wheels can be arranged in two ways: delta trikes have one front wheel and two rear wheels, while tadpole trikes have two front wheels and one rear wheel.

Handcycles

In order to accommodate paraplegics and other individuals with little or no use of their legs, many manufacturers have designed and released hand-powered recumbent trikes, or handcycles. Handcycles are a regular sight at human powered vehicle (HPV) meetings and are beginning to be seen on the streets. They usually follow a delta design with front wheels driven by standard dérailleur gearing powered by hand cranks. Brake levers are usually mounted on the hand holds, which are usually set with no offset rather than the 180° of pedal cranks. The entire crank assembly and the front wheel turn together, allowing the rider to steer and crank simultaneously.

Although arms are weaker than legs, many hand cyclists are able to make use of the power of the whole upper body. A good hand cyclist can still achieve a respectable pace in competitions. Handcycles have also been used for touring, though few designers incorporate mudguards or luggage racks. Also, the gear ratios of standard handcycles tend to be less useful for long steep climbs.

Hand-and-foot recumbent tricycles 
Recumbent cycles offer the possibility of combined hand and foot power inputs, and thus the potential for a full-body workout, and the option for persons with a weak or missing leg(s) to power a cycle. In one recumbent tricycle design the user makes the two front wheels change direction by shifting his center of weight, and moves forward by rotating the rear wheel. There are also hybrids between a handcycle, a recumbent bike and a tricycle; these bikes enable cycling by use of legs, despite a spinal cord injury

Recumbent quadracycles 

Recumbent four-wheel cycles have the same general advantages of tricycles. For quadracycles with only one seat the stability improvements of the fourth wheel offer only a marginal advantage over a tadpole recumbent tricycle. More wheels introduce more weight and more complexity. The fourth wheel is only of the most benefit to the single-seat rider when going off-road. When two and sometimes four riders want to ride together in a sociable configuration the four-wheel recumbent cycle is a viable option.

Homebuilts

As with upright bikes, there is a subculture of recumbent builders who design and build home-built recumbents. Often these are assembled of parts from other bikes, particularly mountain bikes. The frame designs may be as simple as a long steel tube bent into the appropriate shape, or as elaborate as hand-built carbon fiber frames. For many builders, the engineering and construction of the bikes is as much of a challenge as riding them.

Folding
Several manufacturers offer folding recumbents to facilitate packing and travelling.

Couplers
It is possible to add couplers either during manufacturing or as a retrofit so that the frame can be disassembled into smaller pieces to facilitate packing and travel.

Stationary recumbents
As well as road-going recumbent bicycles with wheels, stationary versions also exist. These are often found in gyms but are also available for home use. Like a regular stationary exercise bike, these stay in one place and the user pedals against some kind of resistance mechanism such as a fan or alternator but in a recumbent position. These have the same comfort advantages as road-going recumbents. Stationary recumbents almost always have a fairly upright seat and the pedal crank is lower than the level of the seat. The seat is normally adjustable and is adjusted by sliding it along a rail.

Compared to uprights
 
There are striking differences between recumbents and upright bikes. Since recumbents vary widely, the advantages and disadvantages listed below may apply to different types to different degrees or not at all. (For example, balance is not a concern with tricycles.)

History
 
Recumbent bicycle designs date back to the middle of the 19th century. Several designs were patented around 1900, but these early designs were unsuccessful.

Early recumbents

Recumbent designs of both prone and supine varieties can be traced back to the earliest days of the bicycle. Before the shape of the bicycle settled down following Starley's safety bicycle, there was a good deal of experimentation with various arrangements, and this included designs which might be considered recumbent. Although these dated back to the 1860s the first recorded illustration of a recumbent considered as a separate class of bicycle is considered to be in the magazine Fliegende Blätter of 10 September 1893. This year also saw what is considered the first genuine recumbent, the Fautenil Vélociped. Patent applications for a number of recumbent designs exist in the late years of the 19th century, and there were discussions in the cycling press of the relative merits of different layouts. The Challand designs of 1897 and the American Brown of 1901 are both recognisable as forerunners of today's recumbents.

The Mochet 'Vélo-Velocar' and 'Vélorizontal'

A four-wheeled, two-seater, pedal-propelled car called the 'Velocar' was built in the 1930s by French inventor and light car builder Charles Mochet. Velocars sold well to French buyers who could not afford a motor car, possibly because of a poor economy during the Great Depression. The four-wheeled Velocars were fast but didn't corner well at high speed. Mochet then experimented with a three-wheel design and finally a mould-breaking two-wheel design based on the Vélocar technology.

The early models of Mochet's 'La bicyclette de l'Avenir' (The bicycle of the Future), the 'Vélo-Vélocar', or 'V-V' as the factory referred to them, used a 40mm steel-tube, single-beam frame and 450 x 55 wheels with handlebars over the rider and steering torque transmitted by bevel gears. Various types of Mochet-designed derailleur gears were fitted, with a single gear for the track models. Gears were mid-mounted using primary and secondary chains. The back-rest was adjustable on more sporting models.

To demonstrate the speed of his recumbent bicycle, Mochet had the design ratified by the UCI and UVF and enlisted cyclist Francis Faure, a Category 2 racer, to ride it in races. Faure was highly successful, defeating many of Europe's top cyclists both on the track and in road races, and setting new world records at short distances. Another cyclist, Paul Morand, won the Paris-Limoges race in 1933 on one of Mochet's recumbents.

On 7 July 1933, at a Paris velodrome, Faure rode a modified Vélo-Velocar  in one hour, beating an almost 20-year-old hour record held by Oscar Egg, and attracting a great deal of attention.

When the Union Cycliste Internationale (UCI) met in February 1934, manufacturers of 'upright' bicycles lobbied to have Faure's one-hour record declared invalid. On 1 April 1934, the UCI published a new definition of a racing bicycle that specified how high the bottom bracket could be above the ground, how far it could be in front of the seat and how close it could be to the front wheel. The new definition effectively banned recumbents from UCI events for a combination of tradition, safety, and economic reasons.

Charles Mochet died a short time after the ban was enacted, still protesting against the UCI decision, and the firm continued to make recumbents under his widow and, later, Georges Mochet until at least 1941 for a limited number of customers. Their final versions were a single-chain design named the 'Vélorizontal', the final model using a 'Cyclo' four-speed gear.

After the UCI decision, Faure continued to race, and consistently beat upright bicycles with the Velocar. In 1938, Faure and Mochet's son, Georges, began adding fairings to the Velocar in hopes of bettering the world record of one hour for a bicycle with aerodynamic components. On 5 March 1938, Faure rode a faired Velocar 50.537 kilometers in an hour and became the first cyclist to travel more than 50 kilometers in an hour without the aid of a pace vehicle.

The UCI ban on recumbent bicycles and other aerodynamic improvements virtually stopped development of recumbents for four decades and remains in force. Although recumbent designs continued to crop up over the years they were mainly the work of lone enthusiasts and numbers remained insignificant until the 1970s. Georges Mochet died in 2008.

1970s resurgence and the IHPVA
While developments had been made in this fallow period by Paul Rinkowski and others, the modern recumbent movement was given a boost in 1969 when the Ground Hugger by Robert Riley was featured in Popular Mechanics. There was also the work of Chester Kyle and particularly David Gordon Wilson of MIT, two Americans who opposed the UCI restrictions and continued to work on fairings and recumbents. In 1974, they also nucleated the International Human Power speed Championship in Long Beach, California, from which the IHPVA grew. Kyle and his students had been experimenting with fairings for upright bicycles, also banned by the UCI.  In 1975 the brothers John and Randy Schlitter started producing recumbents at their company, Rans, and became the first U.S. company to do so.

In 1978, the "Vélérique" is the very first commercialized recumbent bicycle (fully faired), by the Belgian Erik Abergen.

The Avatar 2000, a LWB bike very much like the current Easy Racers products, arrived in 1979. It was featured in the 1983 film Brainstorm, ridden by Christopher Walken, and in the popular cycling reference Richard's Bicycle Book by Richard Ballantine. From 1983 to 1991 Steven Roberts toured the U.S. in a modified Avatar, pulling a trailer with solar panels and a laptop, gaining press coverage and writing the book Computing Across America. A faired Avatar 2000 was the first two-wheeler to beat the European Vector three-wheeler in the streamliner races. For about ten years afterward, speed records were exchanged between Easy Racers with Freddy Markham in the cockpit and the Lightning Team. So America's strength became the flying 200 meter sprint in the streamliner division. The oil crises of the 1970s sparked a resurgence in cycling coincident with the arrival of these "new" designs.

A parallel but somewhat separate scene grew up in Europe, with the first European human power championships being held in 1983. The European scene was more dominated by competition than was the US, with the result that European bikes are more likely to be low SWB machines, while LWB are much more popular in the US (although there have been some notable European LWB bikes, such as the Peer Gynt).

In the 1980s 

In 1984, Linear Recumbents of Iowa began producing bicycles. In 2002, Linear Manufacturing's assets were bought by Bicycle Man LLC and moved to New York. Since then owner Peter Stull has been working with senior engineering students at Alfred University, local engineers and machinists utilizing available technology including computer FEA testing to improve their recumbent bikes.

In the UK in the 1980s, the most publicised recumbent cycle in the UK was the delta configuration, sometime electrically powered Sinclair C5. Although sold as an "electric car", the C5 could be characterised as a recumbent tricycle with electrical assistance.

A study by Bussolari and Nadel (1989) led them to pick a recumbent riding position for the Daedalus flight even though the English Channel crossing was accomplished in the Gossamer Albatross with an upright position. Drela in 1998 confirmed "that there was no significant difference in power output between recumbent and conventional bicycling."

In the 2000s 
Three of the largest recumbent manufacturers in the US went out of business after the 1990s, including BikeE (August 2002), ATP-Vision (early 2004) and Burley Design Cooperative (September 2006).

Performance
 

Over distances recumbent bicycles outperform upright bicycles as evidenced by their dominance in ultra-distance events like 24 hours at Sebring. Official speed records for recumbents are governed by the rules of the International Human Powered Vehicle Association. A number of records are recognised, the fastest of which is the "flying 200 m", a distance of 200 m on level ground from a flying start with a maximum allowable tailwind of 1.66 m/s. The official record for an upright bicycle under IHPVA-legal conditions (but at sea level, not high altitude) is  set by Jim Glover in 1986 with an English-made Moulton bicycle with a USA-made hardshell fairing around him and the bike.

The latest known hour record is 92.432 km kilometers (57.434 miles), set by Francesco Russo of Switzerland, using Metastretto on the DEKRA Test Oval track in Klettwitz, Germany, 26.06.2016

The UCI no longer considers the bike Chris Boardman rode for his 1996 record to be in compliance with its definition of an upright bicycle. Boardman's Monocoque bike was designed by Mike Burrows, whose Windcheetah recumbent trike (see above) also holds the record from Land's End to John o' Groats,  in 41 h 4 min 22 s with Andy Wilkinson riding.

In 2003, Rob English took on and beat the UK 4-man pursuit champions VC St Raphael in a 4000 m challenge race at Reading, beating them by a margin of 4 min 55.5 s to 5 min 6.87 s – and dropping one of the St Raphael riders along the way.

In 2009 Team RANS won the Race Across America (RAAM) on recumbents.

See also 

 Bicycle and motorcycle dynamics
 Bicycle and motorcycle geometry
 Bicycle performance
 Bicycle seat
 Bicycle suspension
 Feet forwards motorcycle recumbent motobike equivalent.
 Fastest speed on a bicycle
 Handcycles
 International Human Powered Vehicle Association
 Prone bicycle
 Quadracycle (human-powered vehicle)
 Tricycle
 Unicycle
 Velomobile
 X-seam
 Whike, a recumbent bicycle with a sail
 World Human Powered Vehicle Association

References

Further reading

External links

Recumbent History & Typology
 "Bed Bikes" Save Work , November 1951, Popular Science article that introduced the US to recumbent bicycles—i.e. article at bottom of page 23
Fastest Bicycles: Top Speed and One Hour Performances List – updated frequently
The People of Recumbent Cycling
Recumbent Riders International
Recumbent Community, listing all known manufacturers, dealers, and groups
Recumbent Journal – Recumbent cycling news and commentary

Cycle types
Road cycles
Bicycles